Touch of Pink is a 2004 Canadian-British gay-themed romantic comedy film written and directed by Ian Iqbal Rashid and starring Jimi Mistry, Kyle MacLachlan, and Kristen Holden-Ried. The film takes its title from the Cary Grant film That Touch of Mink.

Plot
Alim is a young gay man, born in Kenya and raised in Toronto, Canada.  He moved to London to get away from his conservative Muslim upbringing.  When his widowed mother, Nuru, announces an unplanned visit that involves staying with him, it creates hardship in the relationship with his boyfriend Giles because they must pretend to be only flatmates, and forces Alim to deal with coming out to his mother.  Meanwhile, Alim has an imaginary friend who appears as Cary Grant, and gives Alim advice when he is in trouble; unfortunately, the advice often seems to result in more trouble.

Cast
 Jimi Mistry as Alim
 Suleka Mathew as Nuru Jahan
 Kristen Holden-Ried as Giles
 Kyle MacLachlan as the spirit of Cary Grant
 Veena Sood as Dolly
 Brian George as Hassan
 Liisa Repo-Martell as Delia
 Raoul Bhaneja as Khaled
 Malika Mendez as Sheruba
 Linda Thorson as Giles' mother
 Andrew Gillies as Raymond
 Dean McDermott as Alisdair Keith

Reception
Touch of Pink premiered at the 2004 Sundance Film Festival to great acclaim, a bidding war, and eventually, a sale to Sony Pictures Classics.

The film received mixed  reviews in its theatrical release; the consensus states: "Kyle MacLachlan does a very good imitation Cary Grant in this forced and contrived tale."

The film grossed $564,535 domestically and $16,520 internationally for a worldwide total of $581,055.

Soundtrack
 "Sailing on the Real True Love" - Emilie-Claire Barlow
 "Loving the World" - Emilie-Claire Barlow
 "Lies of Handsome Men" - Cleo Laine
 "O Rama" - Susheela Raman
 "Nagumomo" - Susheela Raman
 "Summer Son" - Texas
 "When You Want Me" - Breakpoint feat. Jon Banfield
 "Tu Jahan Jahan Chalega" (taken from Bollywood film Mera Saaya) - Lata Mangeshkar
 "Xic" - Me and My
 "Concierto Grosso in a Minor-1st MVT" - Antonio Vivaldi

See also
 List of lesbian, gay, bisexual, or transgender-related films by storyline

References

External links
 
 Touch of Pink at Mongrel Media
 
 
 
 

2004 films
2004 romantic comedy-drama films
English-language Canadian films
Canadian LGBT-related films
British romantic comedy-drama films
British LGBT-related films
2000s English-language films
Films scored by Andrew Lockington
Films set in London
Films set in Toronto
Films shot in London
Films shot in Toronto
Gay-related films
Canadian independent films
Films about interracial romance
Sony Pictures Classics films
2004 LGBT-related films
LGBT-related romantic comedy-drama films
British independent films
2004 independent films
Canadian romantic comedy-drama films
Films about Indian Canadians
2004 comedy films
2004 drama films
British Indian films
2000s Canadian films
2000s British films